Ghomara may refer to:
the Ghomara people
the Ghomara language